Istra is a town and the administrative center of Istrinsky District in Moscow Oblast, Russia, located on the Istra River,  west of Moscow, on the Moscow–Riga railway. Population:  It was previously known as Voskresenskoye, Voskresensk (until 1930).

History
Known since the 16th century as the village of Voskresenskoye, it was acquired by Patriarch Nikon to serve the needs of the neighbouring Voskresensky (Resurrection) Monastery. By 1781, the village had grown into the town of Voskresensk and become the seat of an uyezd.

In 1930, the town was renamed Istra (after the river which flows through it) in order to avoid the old name's religious connotations. As a result of short-term occupation during the Great Patriotic War (from November 25 to December 11, 1941), the town was severely damaged. After the war, Istra became a center of research in the area of electrical power engineering.

Administrative and municipal status
Within the framework of administrative divisions, Istra serves as the administrative center of Istrinsky District. As an administrative division, it is, together with two rural localities, incorporated within Istrinsky District as the Town of Istra. As a municipal division, the Town of Istra is incorporated within Istrinsky Municipal District as Istra Urban Settlement.

Science

Architecture

New Jerusalem Monastery, also known as the Voskresensky Monastery, is located in Istra.

Notable people
Famous Russian short-story writer and playwright Anton Chekhov used to work in Istra and its outskirts, while his brother Ivan Chekhov was a teacher at a local school. Soviet geographer Alexander Kruber was born in Istra.

Twin towns – sister cities

Istra is twinned with:

 Bad Orb, Germany
 Bečej, Serbia
 Dyurtyuli, Russia
 Łobez, Poland
 Loreto, Italy
 Petrich, Bulgaria
 Pinsk, Belarus
 Rakovník, Czech Republic

Education 
There are 4 secondary schools in Istra:

#1 after A. P. Chekhov, founded in 1908

#2 after N.K. Krupskaya, reconstructed in 2008

#3 after M.Y. Lermontov

#4 Liceum

Other educational institutions in Istra:

- Musical School

- School of Arts

- Pedagogical College.

References

Sources

External links

Official website of Istra 
Istra Business Directory 
History and images of New Jerusalem Monastery

Cities and towns in Moscow Oblast
Populated places established in 1781
Zvenigorodsky Uyezd (Moscow Governorate)
Naukograds